Charles Zulu (born 2 January 1996) is a Zambian professional footballer who plays as a midfielder for Sensational Zanaco  and the Zambia national football team.

Early life
He was born in Lusaka. He completed high school in 2012 at David Kaunda Technical School.

Club career
He signed for South African Premier Division club Cape Town City on a four-year contract on 23 October 2020. After one season he went on to Azam.

International career
At the youth level he was capped at under-17, under-20 and under-23 levels.

Zulu made his senior international debut for Zambia in 2014, playing 90 minutes in a 2015 Africa Cup of Nations qualification game against Niger. He scored his first goal at the 2016 COSAFA Cup; the winner in a 3–2 victory over Lesotho.

Career statistics

International

International goals
Scores and results list Zambia's goal tally first.

References

External links
 

1996 births
Living people
Sportspeople from Lusaka
Zambian footballers
Zambia international footballers
Zambia under-20 international footballers
Zambia youth international footballers
Association football midfielders
Zanaco F.C. players
Cape Town City F.C. (2016) players
Azam F.C. players
Zambian expatriate footballers
Expatriate soccer players in South Africa
Zambian expatriate sportspeople in South Africa
Expatriate footballers in Tanzania
Zambian expatriate sportspeople in Tanzania